Samuel Galton may refer to:

Samuel Galton, Jr., arms manufacturer
 Samuel Tertius Galton, businessman and scientist, son of the above